The HBOS Group Reorganisation Act 2006 is a local Act of Parliament, passed by the Parliament of the United Kingdom in June 2006. The aim of the act was to provide HBOS plc, a banking and insurance group in the UK, the legal authority to reorganise its subsidiaries into a simplified structure. It came into effect on 17 September 2007.

Background

HBOS plc is a banking and insurance holding company and was created on 10 September 2001 from the merger of the Governor and Company of the Bank of Scotland and Halifax plc. These two banks are the main UK subsidiaries of HBOS, although they themselves operate various other subsidiary companies. The Bank of Scotland was incorporated by an Act of the Parliament of Scotland in 1695, and operates under the authority of this Act and subsequent other Acts passed in 1873, 1920, 1954 and 1970. Halifax is a public limited company and was created in 1997 from the demutualisation of the Halifax Building Society.

Aims of the Act

The main aim of the Act is to simplify HBOS's operating structure, namely:
 changing the legal status of the Governor and Company of the Bank of Scotland to a public limited company (Bank of Scotland plc); 
 transferring the assets and liabilities of HBOS's UK banking subsidiaries (Halifax plc, Capital Bank plc, and HBOS Treasury Services plc) to the new company ;
 transferring the remaining assets of the Clerical, Medical and General Life Assurance Society to HBOS's subsidiary, Clerical Medical Investment Group Limited and dissolve the society. The bulk of the Society's assets were acquired by Halifax plc in 1997, although some residual assets were not transferred at that time.

Bank of Scotland plc

The Governor and Company of the Bank of Scotland was unusual in its legal structure, as it was a company formed under statute, the 1695 Act, and was governed under the provisions of that Act and successive Acts of Parliament relating to the bank. The most important was the Bank of Scotland Act 1920, which set out the bank's business objectives and its regulations.

HBOS Group wished to restructure the bank into a public limited company (plc) governed under the Companies Act 1985, and transfer the assets and liabilities of its other UK subsidiaries with a banking licence (Capital Bank, Halifax plc and HBOS Treasury Service plc) to the new Bank of Scotland plc. By doing it could save the costs of maintaining four banking licences, and the need for four separate companies, each with their own board of directors. 

The transfer of assets and liabilities from one bank to another also requires the consent of the account holders. For institutions such as the Halifax, this would involve seeking the consent of millions of people, and would be impractical. Thus an Act of Parliament gives HBOS the statutory authority to transfer accounts without seeking individual account holder approval. 

The Act also allowed the company to retain the right to print banknotes.

See also

Lloyds TSB Act 1998

External links
 Select Committee on HBOS Group Reorganisation Bill Minutes of Evidence

United Kingdom Acts of Parliament 2006
Lloyds Banking Group
Banking legislation in the United Kingdom
2006 in economics